Art Forms of Dimensions Tomorrow is an album by the American jazz musician Sun Ra and his Solar Arkestra. Often considered the first of Ra's 'outside' recordings, the album was the first to make extensive use of a discovery by the Arkestra's drummer and engineer Tommy Hunter:
'Art Forms of Dimensions Tomorrow.... contained "Cluster of Galaxies" and "Solar Drums", two rhythm section exercises with the sound treated with such strange reverberations that they threatened to obliterate the instruments' identity and turn the music into low-budget musique concrète. While testing the tape recorder when the musicians were tuning up one day, Hunter had discovered that if he recorded with the earphones on, he could run a cable from the output jack back into the input on the recorder and produce massive reverberation:
"I wasn't sure what Sun Ra would think of it... I thought he might be mad - but he loved it. It blew his mind! By working the volume of the output on the playback I could control the effect, make it fast or slow, drop it out, or whatever." [Tommy Hunter]
'By the 1950s commercial recording companies had developed a classical style of recording which assured that the recording process itself would be invisible... but Sun Ra began to regularly violate this convention on the Saturn releases by recording live at strange sites, by using feedback, distortion, high delay or reverb, unusual microphone placement, abrupt fades or edits, and any number of other effects or noises which called attention to the recording process. On some recordings you could hear a phone ringing, or someone walking near the microphone. It was a rough style of production, an antistyle, a self-reflexive approach which anticipates both free jazz recording conventions and punk production to come.' John F Szwed 

The sleeve was designed by Sun Ra. When re-issued on compact disc by Evidence in 1992, the album was joined with the contemporaneous Cosmic Tones for Mental Therapy.

Track listing

12-inch vinyl 
All songs by Sun Ra
Side A:
 "Cluster of Galaxies" - (2.22)
 "Ankh" - (6.08)
 "Solar Drums" - (2.27)
 "The Outer Heavens" - (4.47)
Side B:
 "Infinity of the Universe" - (7.08)
 "Lights on a Satellite" - (3.08)
 "Kosmos in Blue" - (8.06)

Musicians
 Sun Ra - Piano, Sun Harp, Gong, Percussion
 Manny Smith - Trumpet
 Clifford Thornton - Trumpet on Infinity of the Universe
 Ali Hassan - Trombone
 Pat Patrick - Baritone Sax, Percussion, Clarinet
 John Gilmore - Tenor Sax, Bass Clarinet, Percussion
 Marshall Allen - Alto Sax, Bells, Percussion
 Ronnie Boykins - Bass
 John Ore - Second Bass on Kosmos in Blue
 C. Scoby Stroman - Drums, Percussion
 Clifford Jarvis - Drums on Infinity of the Universe
 Tommy Hunter - Drums, Percussion on Cluster of Galaxies, Lights on a Satellite and Kosmos in Blue

Recorded entirely at the Choreographer's Workshop, New York (the Arkestra's rehearsal space) in 1962, except "Lights on a Satellite" and "Kosmos in Blue", recorded in the same location in either November or December 1961.

Notes 

Sun Ra albums
1962 albums
El Saturn Records albums
Evidence Music albums